David Roth is an American journalist, essayist, and editor. He has written about sports, politics, and culture in Deadspin, The New Republic, SB Nation, New York Magazine, New York Daily News, and other publications. Roth was a senior editor for Deadspin prior to his October 31, 2019 resignation. He is a lifelong fan of the New York Mets and has written about the organization extensively.

Early life

Roth was raised in Ridgewood, New Jersey. With his father's encouragement, he became an avid fan of the New York Mets and the New Jersey Nets. From 1996 to 2000, Roth attended Pomona College where he wrote for the school newspaper, The Student Life. His favorite novel is Moby Dick by Herman Melville.

Career
Roth began his career writing and editing content for the backs of Topps baseball, basketball, and football trading cards. In 2008, Roth became the co-author of The Wall Street Journals "Daily Fix" sports blog. Beginning in 2009, Roth wrote material for MLB.com's fantasy baseball platform. Throughout this time, he also wrote freelance for various outfits, such as The Awl and Can't Stop the Bleeding. In 2013, he became a staff writer at SB Nation, a sports blog. Roth was hired by Deadspin in 2017, and worked there until he resigned—along with the majority of the editorial staff. At Deadspin, in addition to contributing written pieces, Roth hosted a show called Let's Remember Some Guys, in which he used sports trading cards to reminisce about ballplayers from past generations. Together with Drew Magary, Roth also co-hosted the Deadcast, Deadspin'''s flagship podcast.

His essay "Downward Spiral", originally published in The Baffler, was included in The Best American Sports Writing 2018.

Resignation from Deadspin

On October 31, 2019, Roth and many of his colleagues announced their resignation from Deadspin. The Deadspin staff left out of dissatisfaction with the site's new management. In particular, writers had been instructed to "stick to sports," despite the fact that Roth's political commentary was often among the site's most-read content.

Since leaving Deadspin, Roth has continued sports writing freelance. He has also written a number of editorials about Donald Trump, describing him in 2020 as "America's petty, TV-addled, and increasingly degenerate president". Roth maintains a substantial and active presence on Twitter.

Roth and other former Deadspin writers formed Defector Media'' in 2020.

See also
 New Yorkers in journalism

References

21st-century American essayists
21st-century American journalists
21st-century American non-fiction writers
American male essayists
American male journalists
American male non-fiction writers
American online publication editors
American podcasters
American sports journalists
Baseball writers
Journalists from New York City
Living people
People from Ridgewood, New Jersey
Pomona College alumni
The New Republic people
The Wall Street Journal people
Writers from New Jersey
Year of birth missing (living people)